Mokama railway station also known as Mokameh station, station code MKA, is a railway station in Danapur division of East Central Railway.  Mokama is connected to metropolitan areas of India, by the Delhi–Kolkata main line via Mugalsarai–Patna route. Mokama is located in Mokama city in Barh in the Indian state of Bihar. Due to its location on the Howrah–Patna–Mughalsarai main line many Patna, Barauni-bound express trains coming from Howrah, Sealdah, Ranchi, Tatanagar  stop here.
Mokama station is an important of the Danapur division as it links, Assam through the Mokama–Barauni section and North Bihar by the Rajendra Bridge on the Ganga river.

Facilities 
The major facilities available are waiting rooms, computerized reservation facility, Vehicle parking. The vehicles are allowed to enter the station premises. The station also has STD/ISD/PCO Telephone booth, toilets, tea stall and book stall. The Mokama–Kiul section has optical fibre for improved communication and railway safety.

Platforms 
It has four platforms that are interconnected with two foot overbridges.

Its platform number 1 has now IRCTC restaurant.

Trains 

Many passenger and express trains serve Mokama station.

Nearest airport 
The nearest airport to Mokama station are
Lok Nayak Jayaprakash Airport, Patna 
Birsa Munda Airport, Ranchi  
Gaya Airport 
Netaji Subhash Chandra Bose International Airport, Kolkata

References

External links 
 Mokama station Map
 Official website of the Patna district

Railway stations in Patna district
Danapur railway division